Bash Kalateh (also Romanized as Bāsh Kalāteh) is a village in Almeh Rural District, Samalqan District, Maneh and Samalqan County, North Khorasan Province, Iran. At the 2006 census, its population was 291, in 60 families.

References 

Populated places in Maneh and Samalqan County